Spielvereinigung Unterhaching is a German sports club in Unterhaching, a semi-rural municipality on the southern outskirts of the Bavarian capital Munich. The club is widely known for playing in the first-division association football league Bundesliga alongside its more famous cousins, Bayern Munich and 1860 Munich, for two seasons between 1999 and 2001, while the club's bobsleigh department has captured several world and Olympic titles. The football team plays in the Regionalliga (fourth tier).

History

Early history
Originally part of the gymnastics and sports club TSV Hachinger, SpVgg Unterhaching was established as an independent football club on 1 January 1925. Their first promotion to a higher division came in 1931 and they went on to be promoted to the A-Klasse a year later. However, the club was dissolved in 1933 as it was regarded as "politically unreliable" by the Nazis and was not re-established until after the end of World War II in 1945 to resume play in the amateur fourth division B-Klasse.

A rise through the ranks

Unterhaching's football team was only an anonymous local amateur team with no significant successes until a climb through league ranks that began in 1976 with promotion from B-Klasse to A-Klasse play. A first-place finished earned the club quick promotion to the Bezirksliga in 1977. Continued good play put the team into the fourth-division Landesliga Bayern-Süd in 1979 and then the Oberliga Bayern (III), the highest amateur division at the time, by 1981.

Unterhaching finished first there in 1983 to earn an appearance in the playoff round for the 2. Bundesliga, but failed to advance. They suffered a similar fate in 1988 when they next appeared in the promotion round.

The club finally emerged from the Oberliga to play in the 2. Bundesliga in 1989, but were quickly relegated after a 20th-place finish. Promoted a second time in 1992, they were once again sent down after a marginally better 18th-place result. Unterhaching next appeared in the second division in 1995 after a first-place finish in the new Regionalliga Süd (III).

Unterhaching in Bundesliga
With their return to the 2. Bundesliga in the 1995–96 season the club would begin a period that would see them earn their best ever results. They finished 4th that season, then slipped to 6th and 11th-place results in their next two campaigns before securing promotion to the top-flight Bundesliga after a 2nd-place finish in 1999 season.

They went on to surprise everyone with a respectable 10th-place result in their inaugural Bundesliga season and also famously played the spoiler's role in deciding who would win the championship that year. Their first Bundesliga win came in just their second match of the season, with a 2–0 victory over MSV Duisburg at home. While struggling in away matches, Unterhaching remained undefeated at home in nine games before losing 0–2 to their stronger neighbours, Bayern Munich. Prior to this loss, they had earned wins at home in matches against highly favoured teams like VfB Stuttgart and Borussia Dortmund, beating them 2–0 and 1–0 respectively. They earned their first away win in the Bundesliga by beating VfB Stuttgart 2–0 once again.

On the final matchday of the season, visiting Bayer Leverkusen needed only a draw in Unterhaching to secure their first national title, but instead went down to defeat to the determined home side. Things took a sinister turn for Leverkusen when Michael Ballack scored an own goal that put home side ahead in the 20th minute. Their title hopes ended when Haching midfielder Markus Oberleitner made the score 2–0 in the 72nd minute. Meanwhile, Bayern Munich beat Werder Bremen 3–1 at home and were able to overtake Leverkusen on goal difference to snatch away the title. With a 10th-place result, Unterhaching finished ahead of long-established sides Borussia Dortmund and Schalke 04. They ended the season with the league's fifth best home record with 10 wins and 5 draws in 17 matches having lost only to Bayern Munich and 1. FC Kaiserslautern.

Goalkeeper Gerhard Tremmel, defenders Alexander Strehmel and Jochen Seitz, midfielders Markus Oberleitner and André Breitenreiter and striker Altin Rraklli were among the most memorable players of a team that impressed by its discipline. Breitenreiter and Rraklli scored 13 Bundesliga goals between them that season.

However, the start of the 2000–01 season was a nightmare for Unterhaching as they would win only one and draw two of their first eight matches. While the team went undefeated in its next six matches, they were unable to maintain that form and at the mid-season break were only out of the relegation zone on goal difference. The second half of the season was just as dismal, and although they earned wins over local rivals Bayern Munich and 1860 Munich, their campaign would end with a 16th-place result and relegation.

As the season drew to a close Unterhaching was once again in a position to help Bayern Munich win another title. Needing only to hold second-place Schalke 04 to a draw in their final match to ensure Bayern's win, Unterhaching held 2–0 and 3–2 advantages before finally succumbing 3–5 to Schalke. Bayern then had to make their own way to the championship with at least a draw against Hamburger SV which they only narrowly managed on a Patrik Andersson equalizer (1–1) deep into stoppage time.

Ironically, in the middle of their poor season, SpVgg Unterhaching would emerge as winners of the last DFB-Hallenpokal, an indoor football tournament staged during the winter break of the Bundesliga season from 1987 to 2001.

Recent history
The club's struggles continued after their relegation to the 2. Bundesliga. Needing an away win in their final match of the season in order to avoid being sent down to the Regionalliga Süd (III), they instead went down to a 0–3 defeat to Karlsruher SC and finished in 15th place. They re-bounded the following season, taking the Regionalliga title, and making their way back to second division competition. Subsequently, Haching has delivered poor results in the 2. Bundesliga, narrowly avoiding being relegated again in both 2004 and 2006 before finally dropping into the Regionalliga in 2007, finishing 16th in the table due to FC Carl Zeiss Jena's 2–1 win against FC Augsburg.

In the 2007–08 season, the club was never really in contention for a 2. Bundesliga return but did qualify for the new 3. Liga. In its first season in the new, nationwide 3. Liga, the club was close to promotion, but a loss 3–4-loss against Carl Zeiss Jena on the 37th matchday earned them a fall from second to fourth place, and a prolonged stay in the third league.

In 2009–10 the club started well, but went down the table during winter. 2008–09's successful coach Ralph Hasenhüttl got replaced by the 1990-world champion Klaus Augenthaler, who led the team to a finish on a secure 11th place.

The club finished one place above the relegation zone in the 3. Liga in 2013–14, coming 17th but was relegated to the tier four Regionalliga Bayern at the end of the 2014–15 season. It qualified for the 2015–16 DFB-Pokal where it knocked-out FC Ingolstadt 04 and RB Leipzig before losing to Bayer Leverkusen in the third round.

Honours
The club's honours:

League
 2. Bundesliga (II)
 Runners-up: 1999
 Regionalliga Süd (III)
 Champions: 1995, 2003
 Bayernliga (III)
 Champions: 1983, 1988, 1989, 1992
 Runners-up: 1991
 Regionalliga Bayern (IV)
 Champions: 2017
 Landesliga Bayern-Süd (IV)
 Champions: 1981
 Runners-up: 2001‡
 Bezirksoberliga Oberbayern (VI)
 Champions: 1999‡

Cup
 Bavarian Cup
 Winners: 2008, 2012, 2015
 Runners-up: 2016
 Oberbayern Cup
 Winners: 2004‡, 2008, 2009

Youth
 Bavarian Under 19 championship
 Champions: 2004, 2008, 2011
 Runners-up: 2007, 2015, 2016
 Bavarian Under 17 championship
 Champions: 2002, 2004, 2011, 2016
 Runners-up: 2007, 2009
 Bavarian Under 15 championship
 Champions: 2011
 Runners-up: 1993, 2004, 2006, 2013, 2015, 2016
 ‡ Reserve team

Players

First-team squad

Recent managers
Recent managers of the club:

Recent seasons
The recent season-by-season performance of the club:

With the introduction of the Regionalligas in 1994 and the 3. Liga in 2008 as the new third tier, below the 2. Bundesliga, all leagues below dropped one tier.

Key

Reserve team

SpVgg Unterhaching II (or SpVgg Unterhaching Amateure) belong to the Bayernliga since 2001, coming ninth in the 2007–08 season of this league. Due to a number of clubs in the league not receiving a licence for the Regionalliga, the team gained entry to the Regionalliga Süd for the 2008–09 season. The team returned to the Bayernliga again after being relegated in 2009.

In March 2015, the club announced that it would withdraw its reserve team at the end of the 2014–15 season after a rule change that allowed 3. Liga Clubs to do so. SpVgg Unterhaching stated financial reasons for this step.

Stadium
SpVgg Unterhaching's home stadium is the municipal Stadion am Sportpark (capacity 15,053), now known as Alpenbauer Sportpark under a sponsorship arrangement with the club. The club's fan base is local in character, although it has developed a small following as one of Germany's "Kult" teams.

Until 1960, Haching played their home matches at the Jahnstraße football field and moved then to the Grünauer Allee stadium, which has about 4,000 standing places and where they played before the Sportpark stadium opened in April 1992. The Grünauer Allee stadium is now home ground of the club's reserve squad, Haching II, which is currently playing in the fourth-division Oberliga Bayern.
The Grünauer Allee stadium is also the home ground of Fortuna Unterhaching, established in 1992 and playing close to the bottom end of the German league system. During winter, Fortuna Unterhaching shares the artificial football pitch owned by SpVgg Unterhaching.

Bobsleigh

In 1975, local entrepreneur and club sponsor Anton Schrobenhauser († 1982) founded the bobsleigh department, which he presided over until 1979. The club's bobsledders have since achieved a number of excellent results on the national and international level.

Numerous Olympic medals and world championship titles make Christoph Langen Unterhaching's outstanding bobsledder. His honours include:
Olympics 2-man crew: 2002 (Gold); 1992, 1998 (Bronze)
Olympics 4-man crew: 1998 (Gold)
World champion 2-man crew: 1993, 1995, 1996, 2000, 2001
World champion 4-man crew: 1996, 2001
World Cup 2-man crew: 1996, 1999, 2004
World Cup 4-man crew: 1996, 1999
European champion 2-man crew: 1994, 1995, 1996, 2001, 2004
European champion 4-man crew: 1996, 1999

References

External links

The Abseits Guide to German Soccer
SpVgg Unterhaching profile at Weltfussball.de

 
Association football clubs established in 1925
Football clubs in Germany
Football clubs in Bavaria
Multi-sport clubs in Germany
Football in Upper Bavaria
1925 establishments in Germany
Bundesliga clubs
Munich (district)
2. Bundesliga clubs
3. Liga clubs